Jarosch is a surname. Found mainly in Germany and Austria, it comes from Czech/Slovak Jaroš, Polish Jarosz, and Ukrainian Yarosh. Notable people with this surname include:
 Harry Jarosch, Austrian canoeist
 Karl Jarosch (born 1931), Austrian footballer
 Nadine Jarosch (born 1995), German gymnast
 Stefan Jarosch (born 1984), German footballer
 Imre Jarosch (born 1960), Hungarian design artist

See also
 

Surnames of Slavic origin